Death with Dignity Act may refer to:

California End of Life Option Act, 2016
Oregon Death with Dignity Act
Washington Death with Dignity Act
Advance Directives Act, Texas law passed in 1999

See also
Assisted suicide in the United States
Death with dignity (disambiguation)
End-of-life care
Euthanasia
Carrie & Lowell, a track on a music album